The women's 400 metre freestyle event at the 2008 Olympic Games took place on 10–11 August at the Beijing National Aquatics Center in Beijing, China.

Rebecca Adlington became Great Britain's first female gold medalist in swimming in 48 years. She posted an outside-record time of 4:03.22 to pip U.S. swimmer Katie Hoff in the final 5 metres after a 1.46-second deficit, with one length to go. Hoff added a silver to her hardware from the 400 m individual medley just a day earlier, in 4:03.29. Adlington's teammate Joanne Jackson earned a bronze in 4:03.52, handing 2 of the 3 medals won by Team GB in the pool.

France's Coralie Balmy narrowly missed the podium by eight hundredths of a second (0.08), finishing in fourth place at 4:03.60. Italy's world record holder and top favorite Federica Pellegrini earned a fifth spot in a time of 4:04.56, holding off Romania's Camelia Potec to sixth by 0.10 of a second (4:04.66). Australia's Bronte Barratt (4:05.05) and defending Olympic champion Laure Manaudou (4:11.26).

Notable swimmers missed out the top 8 final, featuring Poland's Otylia Jędrzejczak, silver medalist in Athens four years earlier, Hoff's teammate Kate Ziegler, and South Africa's Wendy Trott, who broke a new African record (4:08.38) in the heats.

Earlier in the prelims, Pellegrini, Hoff, Jackson, and Adlington broke one of the oldest Olympic records in the book as they each went under the time of 4:03.85, which had stood since Janet Evans won the gold medal in the event at the 1988 Summer Olympics in Seoul.

Records
Prior to this competition, the existing world and Olympic records were as follows:

The following new world and Olympic records were set during this competition.

Results

Heats

Final

References

External links
Official Olympic Report

Women's freestyle 400 metre
2008 in women's swimming
Women's events at the 2008 Summer Olympics